Carex elata, tufted sedge, is a species in the genus Carex, native to all of Europe, the Atlas Mountains of Africa, Turkey, Iran and Central Asia. It prefers to grow with its roots in water. Its cultivar 'Aurea' has gained the Royal Horticultural Society's Award of Garden Merit.

Subspecies
The following subspecies are currently accepted:
Carex elata subsp. elata
Carex elata subsp. omskiana (Meinsh.) Jalas (synonym: Carex omskiana  Meinsh.)

References

elata
Plants described in 1785